The qualification for the 2007 European Baseball Championship was held from July 25–29, 2006 in Russia and August 1–5, 2006 in Belgium. 16 nations contested to qualify for 2 spots available among the 10 other sides already qualified. In the end, 3 teams qualified for the 2007 competition, because of the removal of Greece. Austria replaced Greece, being the runners-up in the qualifier pool in Russia, while Croatia and Russia won their qualifier pools and were qualified to compete in the 2007 competition, to be placed with the 9 already qualified teams from the 2005 competition. These were Czech Republic, France, Germany, Italy, Netherlands, Spain, Sweden, Ukraine and United Kingdom.

Qualifier Pool 1

Group stage

Group A

Group B

Final round

Group C

Semi-finals

3rd place

Final

Qualifier Pool 2

Group stage

Group A

Group B

Final round

Group C

Semi-finals

3rd place

Final

External links
Game Results Pool 1
Game Results Pool 2

References

European Baseball Championship – Qualification
Qualifier for 2007 European Baseball Championship
International baseball competitions hosted by Belgium
2006 in Russian sport
European Baseball Championship qualification
European Baseball Championship qualification
Baseball in Russia
International sports competitions hosted by Russia
European Baseball Championship qualification